Adrian Pang Yeow Soon (born 8 January 1966) is a Singaporean actor, host, and contracted artiste under FLY Entertainment and prominently a full-time Mediacorp artiste from 1990 to 2010. He first came to prominence in Singaporean television by acting in English-language and Chinese-language television dramas produced by MediaCorp and SPH MediaWorks in the 1990s. Since then, he has diversified into hosting and theatre production. More recently, he had a small role in the Hollywood cybercrime movie Blackhat (2015), starring Chris Hemsworth and Wang Leehom.

Early life and career
Pang was born in Malacca, Malaysia, but emigrated to Singapore shortly after with his family. He was educated at Anglo-Chinese School and Anglo-Chinese Junior College. Although he graduated with a law degree from Keele University in Britain, he did not practice, he trained at the ARTTS International in Bubwith instead. He worked for a number of years in British theatre and television before returning to Singapore. While he was based in Britain, he would occasionally return to Singapore for stage work where he first caught the eye of Singaporeans when he starred in the Singaporean comedy film Forever Fever (1998).

Career

Homecoming

Upon returning home, Pang joined Mediacorp. Pang later switched to SPH MediaWorks as a producer-presenter when the new company was established in 2001. It was around this time in 2001 that he moved back permanently to Singapore with his family. He quickly established himself as a household name through his work on SPH MediaWorks Channel i. A versatile talent, he excelled in hosting as well as acting, such as in the comedy Durian King and the main actor in the channel's final production, Six Weeks, before its impending merger with Mediacorp in 2005. An original idea of his, Pang co-wrote Six Weeks and was part of the creative process from start to finish.

Recognition
Re-employed by Mediacorp after the merger, he went on to appear in Chinese dramas on Mediacorp Channel 8, such as the blockbuster drama Portrait of Home (同心圆) in 2005. His portrayal of the eccentric Dadi earned him a Best Actor nomination in Star Awards 2005. He achieved this accolade despite the fact that he is much more comfortable speaking in English than in Mandarin (something many English-speaking Singaporeans can relate to). Indeed, he admitted he had much difficulty acting in the show. He even describes himself as a 'kentang', a Malay term, to describe someone who is very Westernised.

He also starred in Jack Neo's romantic comedy I Do I Do (2005) with Sharon Au. He also appeared on Makan King on Channel U, Nine Lives on Arts Central and Maggi & Me on Mediacorp Channel 5. In March 2007, he clinched the coveted Best Actor award at the national Life! Theater Awards for 2006.

He has also appeared in various theatrical performances such as Forbidden City: Portrait of An Empress (2002), A Twist of Fate (2005), The Dresser, The Odd Couple and many others.

Pang's humour makes him one of the more sought-after hosts in Singaporean media. He was the host for The Arena and Deal or No Deal aired on Mediacorp Channel 5. He has also helped to host the National Day Parade Celebrations in Singapore as well as Miss Singapore Universe.

He also played the male lead in the series Parental Guidance opposite Hong Kong actress, Jessica Hsuen. That was also the first time Pang played a legal professional on television.

In 2008, he filmed a Chinese drama serial, Nanny Daddy, which was telecast on Channel 8 in September that year.

In 2009, he snared a leading role as a "blind" lawyer named Alex Sung bent on revenge in the Channel 5 blockbuster drama Red Thread and clinched the "Best Actor" award at the 14th Asian Television Awards (ATA).

In January 2010, Pang announced that after his current artiste contract with Mediacorp expires in March, he will "experimentally" leave the entertainment industry, and establish a drama company with his wife, to be called "PANGDEMONiUM!". According to Pang, the "experimental" leave was made possible via a prior arrangement with Mediacorp executives, and that he is open to returning to Mediacorp, or act in Mediacorp projects, in the future. At this time he did not appear for the last few episodes in New City Beat and acted in Channel 8 drama series With You.

PANGDEMONiUM!'s inaugural production was The Full Monty held in June 2010, based on The Full Monty. Their next production, Closer showed from February to March 2011. Their third play, Dealer's Choice was played from 29 September to 12 October 2011. They went on to produce Spring Awakening in February 2012 and Swimming with Sharks in September 2012.

In 2012, Pang starred in the Mediacorp Raintree Pictures movie Dance Dance Dragon (龙众舞) alongside Kym Ng and Dennis Chew. The movie was aired in all local cinemas during the Lunar New Year period.

In late 2012, Pang starred in the Singapore Repertory Theatre's production of God of Carnage. The next year, he went on to star in a stage adaptation of Rabbit Hole opposite popular actress Janice Koh.

In 2014, Pang wrote his first book for children, Hansel and Girl Girl. The children's picture book, illustrated by Cultural Medallion winner Milenko Prvacki, transplants the traditional Hansel and Gretel fairy tale to a Singapore setting. Published by Epigram Books, part of the proceeds went to charity.

In recent years, Pang is best known to play the fictional role of a senior lawyer, Dennis Tang, in MediaCorp's The Pupil and Code of Law television drama series. Ironically, in real life, Pang actually graduated with a law degree from University of Keele (UK) in his younger years, though he did not go into a legal job.

Personal life

Pang is married to Tracie Howitt in 1995. They have two sons.

Filmography

Television

Shows hosted

Films

Theatre

Awards and nominations

Star Awards

Asian Television Awards

Bibliography

References

External links
 
 Profile on xin.msn.com
 Bio
 MDA Bio
 PANGDEMONiUM

1966 births
Alumni of RADA
Living people
Singaporean male film actors
Singaporean male stage actors
Singaporean people of Hakka descent
Anglo-Chinese School alumni
Anglo-Chinese Junior College alumni
Alumni of Keele University
Singaporean television personalities
Singaporean male television actors
Malaysian emigrants to Singapore
20th-century Singaporean male actors
21st-century Singaporean male actors